Sultan Rashid Abdillahi was the sixth Grand Sultan of the Isaaq Sultanate and reigned from 1967 to 1969, when he was succeeded by his brother Abdiqadir Abdillahi.

Biography
Rashid was active in independence and post-independence politics and accompanied his father Sultan Abdillahi Deria. In 1966 he would lead a delegation of the Somali Parliament to Teheran and the 55th World Interparliamentary Conference.

References 

20th-century Somalian people
Somali sultans
Somalian Muslims
Year of birth missing
1969 deaths

Grand Sultans of the Isaaq Sultanate